Blue Monday is the name given to a day in January (typically the third Monday of the month) said by a UK travel company, Sky Travel, to be the most depressing day of the year. The concept was first published in a 2005 press release from the company, which claimed to have calculated the date using an "equation". It takes into account weather conditions and thus only applies to the Northern Hemisphere.

Scientists have dismissed the idea as baseless pseudoscience.

History 
This date was published in a press release under the name of Cliff Arnall, who was at the time a tutor at the Centre for Lifelong Learning, a Further Education centre attached to Cardiff University. Guardian columnist Ben Goldacre reported that the press release was delivered substantially pre-written to a number of academics via public relations agency Porter Novelli, along with an offer of money to those who offered to put their names to it. A statement later printed in the Guardian sought to distance leaders of Cardiff University from Arnall:  "Cardiff University has asked us to point out that Cliff Arnall . . . was a former part-time tutor at the university but left in February."

Variations of the story have been repeatedly reused by other companies in press releases, with 2014 seeing Blue Monday invoked by legal firms and retailers of bottled water and alcoholic drinks.  Some versions of the story purport to analyse trends in social media posts to calculate the date.

In 2018, Arnall told a reporter at the Independent newspaper that it was "never his intention to make the day sound negative", but rather "to inspire people to take action and make bold life decisions".  It was also reported that he was working with Virgin Atlantic and Virgin Holidays, having "made it his mission to challenge some of the negative news associated with January and to debunk the melancholic mind-set of 'Blue Monday'".

Date 
The date is generally reported as falling on the third Monday in January, but also on the second or fourth Monday. The first such date declared was 24 January in 2005 as part of a Sky Travel press release.

Calculation 
The formula uses many factors, including: weather conditions, debt level (the difference between debt accumulated and ability to pay), time since Christmas, time since new year’s resolutions have been broken, low motivational levels, and the feeling of a need to take action. One relationship used by Arnall in 2006 was:

where Tt = travel time; D = delays; C = time spent on cultural activities; R = time spent relaxing; ZZ = time spent sleeping; St = time spent in a state of stress; P = time spent packing; Pr = time spent in preparation. Units of measurement are not defined; as all the factors involve time, dimensional analysis of the "formula" shows that it violates the fundamental property of dimensional homogeneity and is thus meaningless.

The 2005 press release and a 2009 press release used a different formula:

where W=weather, D=debt, d=monthly salary, T=time since Christmas, Q=time since the failure of new year's resolutions, M=low motivational levels, and Na=the feeling of a need to take action. Again, no units were defined; the lack of any explanation for what is meant by "weather" and "low motivational levels" means the dimensional homogeneity of the resulting formula cannot be assessed or verified, rendering it similarly meaningless.

Ben Goldacre has observed that the equations "fail even to make mathematical sense on their own terms", pointing out that under Arnall's original equation, packing for ten hours and preparing for 40 will always guarantee a good holiday, and that "you can have an infinitely good weekend by staying at home and cutting your travel time to zero". Dean Burnett, a neuroscientist who has worked in the psychology department of Cardiff University, has described the work as "farcical", with "nonsensical measurements".

In 2016, Arnall claimed to have attempted to "overturn" his "theory" by visiting the Canary Islands; his claim was publicised by the Canary Islands Tourism Board

Happiest day 
Arnall also says, in a press release commissioned by Wall's ice cream, that he has calculated the happiest day of the year – in 2005, 24 June, in 2006, 23 June, in 2008, 20 June and in 2010, 18 June. So far, this date has fallen close to Midsummer in the Northern Hemisphere (June 21 to 24).

References

External links 
 BBC pages referencing Blue Monday: 2005; 2009; 2012
 

2000s neologisms
Holidays and observances by scheduling (nth weekday of the month)
January observances
Monday
Pseudoscience
Unofficial observances